MacLeod most often refers to the surnames MacLeod, Macleod, McLeod, and Mcleod.

MacLeod and Macleod may also refer to:

Places
Macleod, Victoria, suburb of Melbourne, Australia
Macleod Trail (Calgary) a Major arterial road in Calgary, Alberta
Fort Macleod, Alberta, town in Alberta, Canada

Electoral districts
Macleod (electoral district), a federal electoral district in Alberta
Macleod (provincial electoral district), a former provincial electoral district in Alberta
Macleod (N.W.T. electoral district) a former territorial electoral district in the Northwest Territories
Livingstone-Macleod, a current provincial electoral district in Alberta
Pincher Creek-Macleod, a former provincial electoral district in Alberta

Other
73rd (Perthshire) Regiment of Foot, a Highland Infantry unit of the British Army, also known as MacLeod's Highlanders
Clan MacLeod, Scottish clan
Clan MacLeod of Lewis, Scottish clan
Lake Macleod, lake in Western Australia
McLeod Lake, British Columbia, formerly Fort McLeod; named for Archibald McLeod

See also
McLeod (disambiguation)
MacLeòid
McLoud (disambiguation)
McCloud (disambiguation)